is BoA's twenty-seventh Japanese single. It was released on February 18, 2009 in two formats, CD-only and CD+DVD. The CD edition also comes in a first press limited edition. The second A-side, Universe, features fellow J-pop singer Crystal Kay and label mate, Verbal of M-Flo. The third A-side is the acoustic version of Ravex's single "Believe in Love", which features BoA. The 4th track on the Limited Edition version of the single, Best Hit Mega Blend [Limited Edition Bonus Track], is a mashup of multiple of her best hits in Japan.

Track list

Live performances
 04/06 - Music Station (Eien)
 04/09 - NHK BShi (Eien) (with I Did It for Love, Meri Kuri)
 04/29 - Gekkan Melodix! (Eien)

Charts
Oricon Sales Chart (Japan)

Certifications
 "Eien"

References

2009 singles
BoA songs
Crystal Kay songs
Songs written by Pontus Winnberg
Songs written by Christian Karlsson (DJ)
Songs written by Henrik Jonback
Song recordings produced by Bloodshy & Avant
Songs written by Verbal (rapper)
Avex Trax singles